Human sleep and sleep in animals are a form of rest.

Sleep or sleeping may also refer to:

People with the name
 Sleep (rapper) (born 1976), American underground hip hop artist
 Colin Sleep (born 1944), Australian footballer
 Norman Sleep (born 1945), American geophysicist
 Peter Sleep (born 1957), Australian cricketer
 Wayne Sleep (born 1948), British dancer, director, and choreographer

Arts, entertainment, and media

Films

 Sleep (1964 film), a 1964 film by Andy Warhol
 Sleep (2013 film), a 2013 film directed by Juha Lilja

Music

Groups
 Sleep (band), American doom metal band
 Team Sleep, American ambient rock group

Albums 
 Sleep (album), a 2015 album by Max Richter
Sleep, a 2001 EP by Strata

Classical compositions
 "Sleep" (Eric Whitacre song), a 2000 choral piece
 "Sleep", a 1912 song by Ivor Gurney
 "Sleep", a 1922 composition by Peter Warlock
 "Sleep", a 2006 song by Richard Causton 
 "Sleep", a 2010 song by Ronald Corp
 Søvnen (The Sleep), a 1905 cantata by Carl Nielsen

Songs
 "Sleep" (1920s song), by Fred Waring's Pennsylvanians, 1923
 "Sleep" (Marion song), 1995
 "Sleep" (Texas song), 2006
 "Sleep", by the 3rd and the Mortal from In This Room, 1997
 "Sleep (I've Been Slipping)", by Code Orange Kids from Love Is Love/Return to Dust, 2012
 "Sleep", by Conjure One from Conjure One, 2002
 "Sleep", by Copeland from In Motion, 2005
 "Sleep", by Cult of Luna from Cult of Luna, 2001
 "Sleep", by The Dandy Warhols from Thirteen Tales from Urban Bohemia, 2000
 "Sleep", by Donovan from Cosmic Wheels, 1973
 "Sleep", by Godspeed You! Black Emperor from Lift Your Skinny Fists Like Antennas to Heaven, 2000
 "Sleep", by Imogen Heap from IMegaphone, 1998
 "Sleep", by Johnny Orlando from Teenage Fever, 2019
 "Sleep", by Lagwagon from Hoss, 1995
 "Sleep", by Lazlo Bane from 11 Transistor, 1997
 "Sleep", by Les Paul, 1953 (Fred Waring's Pennsylvanians song cover)
 "Sleep", by Midnight Oil from Red Sails in the Sunset, 1984
 "Sleep", by My Chemical Romance from The Black Parade, 2006
 "Sleep", by Nada Surf from High/Low, 1996
 "Sleep", by Phish from Farmhouse, 2000
 "Sleep", by Poets of the Fall from Signs of Life, 2005
 "Sleep", by Savatage from Edge of Thorns, 1993
 "Sleep", by Stabbing Westward from Wither Blister Burn & Peel, 1996
 "Sleep", by Story of the Year from In the Wake of Determination, 2005
 "Sleep", by Transit from Young New England, 2013
 "Sleep", by Underground Lovers from Underground Lovers, 1990
 "Sleep", by Wuthering Heights from The Shadow Cabinet, 2006
 "Sleep Song", by Rooney from Calling the World, 2007
 "Sleep Song", by Raffi from Good Luck Boy, 1975
 "Sleepin'", by Diana Ross from Last Time I Saw Him, 1973
 "Sleepin'", by Relient K from Air for Free, 2016
 "Sleeping" (The Band song), 1970
 "Sleeping" (Rick Astley song), 2001
 "The Sleep", by Pantera from Cowboys from Hell, 1990

Paintings
 Sleep, a 1937 painting by Salvador Dalí
 The Sleep (Baba), by Corneliu Baba

Periodicals
 Sleep (journal), a medical journal covering research on sleep
 SLEEP, the official publication of the Associated Professional Sleep Societies (also known as the Sleep Research Society)

Computing and technology 
 Sleep (command), a command that delays program execution for a specified period of time
 Sleep (system call), an operating system call to suspend the execution of a program for specified period of time
 Sleep mode, in which a computer becomes inactive
 Sleep programming language, a scripting language executed on the Java platform

Science
 Rheum, commonly known as "sleep", mucus formed in the eyes during sleep
 To "sleep with someone", implies a person having sexual intercourse or other forms of sexual activity with another person
 Transient paresthesia, the sensation produced by an extremity which has "fallen asleep"

See also 
 Asleep (disambiguation)
 The Big Sleep (disambiguation)